Jovica Cvetković (born 18 September 1959) is a Serbian handball coach and former player who competed for Yugoslavia in the 1980 Summer Olympics.

Club career
At club level, Cvetković played for Crvena zvezda (two spells), Metaloplastika, GWD Minden, Elgorriaga Bidasoa, Teka Cantabria, Conversano and Conquense. He won the European Cup with Metaloplastika in the 1984–85 season.

International career
At international level, Cvetković represented Yugoslavia in the 1980 Summer Olympics. He was also a member of the team that won the 1986 World Championship.

Coaching career
During his coaching career, Cvetković won domestic doubles in three countries: Serbia and Montenegro (with Crvena zvezda in 2003–04), Macedonia (with Metalurg Skopje in 2005–06), and Bosnia and Herzegovina (with Borac Banja Luka in 2012–13).

In September 2006, Cvetković was appointed as head coach for Serbia. He led the team at the 2009 World Championship in the nation's debut appearance in major tournaments. After winning the gold medal at the 2009 Mediterranean Games, Cvetković stepped down from his position.

In 2012, Cvetković served as head coach of Serbian Handball Super League team Železničar 1949 on two separate occasions (April–June and October–December).

Honours

Player
Metaloplastika
 Yugoslav Handball Championship: 1984–85
 European Cup: 1984–85

Coach
Crvena zvezda
 Serbia and Montenegro Handball Super League: 2003–04
 Serbia and Montenegro Handball Cup: 2003–04
Metalurg Skopje
 Macedonian Handball Super League: 2005–06
 Macedonian Handball Cup: 2005–06
Borac Banja Luka
 Handball Championship of Bosnia and Herzegovina: 2012–13
 Handball Cup of Bosnia and Herzegovina: 2012–13

References

External links
 Olympic record
 

1959 births
Living people
Handball players from Belgrade
Serbian male handball players
Yugoslav male handball players
Olympic handball players of Yugoslavia
Handball players at the 1980 Summer Olympics
RK Crvena zvezda players
RK Metaloplastika players
CB Cantabria players
Liga ASOBAL players
Expatriate handball players
Yugoslav expatriate sportspeople in Germany
Yugoslav expatriate sportspeople in Spain
Yugoslav expatriate sportspeople in Italy
Serbian handball coaches
Serbian expatriate sportspeople in North Macedonia
Serbian expatriate sportspeople in Romania
Serbian expatriate sportspeople in Bosnia and Herzegovina